Edward John Mawby Buxton (16 December 1912 – 11 December 1989) was a scholar, university teacher, poet and an ornithologist who played a significant part in the development of ornithology  in Britain in the years immediately after World War II.

Early life 
John Buxton was born in Bramhall, Cheshire, and educated at Yarlet Hall, Malvern College, and New College, Oxford.  Before the war he visited Norway several times and gave lectures on English Literature at Oslo University.  He also went on digging expeditions to Palestine and Ireland.  He was Warden at Skokholm Bird Observatory in 1939 with his wife, Marjorie (Ronald Lockley's sister), conducting research and bird ringing.

World War II
At the outbreak of war Buxton was reading for his D.Phil. at Oxford. He volunteered for the Navy, but when a special appeal came from the War Office for men with certain language qualifications he responded to that.  After little over two months at an infantry OCTU he was posted, as an intelligence officer, to the 1st Independent Company (later to become the 1st Commandos)  to Norway and was taken prisoner early in May 1940. In July he reached Prisoners of War Camp, Oflag VII C/H in Laufen Castle.

At this camp, the prisoners organised a 'University' and Buxton gave lectures in English and helped in the work of the library.  His love of the countryside and of birds, apparent in his poetry, was a constant solace in camp life and bird-watching was, for him and several of his fellow prisoners, Peter Conder, John Barrett and George Waterston, one of the keenest of their few pleasures.  They were brought together in Oflag VIB near Warburg  and later in Oflag VIIB at Eichstatt., John was assisted by Erwin Stresemann, who sent rings to use in camp and some useful literature, including Niethammer's Handbuch der Deutschen Vogelkunde. His research during the incarceration years helped produce the New Naturalist monograph The Redstart (1950).

Westward was written in prison camp.  It was of particular interest that prisoners should be able to carry on their literary work and for it eventually to reach England.

Post-war
In 1946 Buxton became vice warden of Skomer Field Study Centre and as a member of West Wales Field Studies Council played a key part in establishing the original Bird Observatory committee. He gave the 1970 Warton Lecture on Poetry.

His life to retirement in 1979 was spent as Fellow of New College Oxford and reader in English literature in the university.

Books
 Buxton, John.  The Pilgrimage (1936)
 Buxton, John. Judas (1938)
 Buxton, John.  Westward (1942) Jonathan Cape Ltd
 Buxton, John.  Such Liberty (1944)
 Buxton, John. Atropos and other poems, (1946)  MacMillan & Co Ltd
 Buxton, John.  A Marriage Song for The Princess Elizabeth (1947) MacMillan & Co Ltd
 Lockley, R.M. & Buxton, John. (1950).  Island of Skomer.  Staples Press.
 Buxton, John (1950). The Redstart.  New Naturalist
 Buxton, John (1954). Sir Philip Sidney and the English Renaissance.
 Buxton, John (1963).  Elizabethan Taste.  MacMillan & Co Ltd.
 Buxton, John (1967).  A Tradition of Poetry.  MacMillan & Co Ltd
 Buxton, John (1992).  Walking in the Snow and Other Poems. The Perpetua Press, ed. Jon Stallworthy et al

Notes

External links 
 Marcham Society
 Bird men POWs

British ornithologists
1989 deaths
20th-century British poets
20th-century British male writers
20th-century British zoologists
Officers' Training Corps officers
Military personnel from Cheshire
British World War II prisoners of war
1912 births
People educated at Malvern College
British Army Commandos officers
Alumni of New College, Oxford
New Naturalist writers
British male poets
British Army personnel of World War II
World War II prisoners of war held by Germany